Hotovlje may refer to the following places:

In Bosnia and Herzegovina:
Hotovlje, Kalinovik, a village in the Municipality of Kalinovik

In Slovenia:
Hotovlja, a settlement in the Municipality of  Gorenja Vas–Poljane (known as Hotovlje until 1993)